CD USA, which debuted in 2006, was an American music television show which aired exclusively on DirecTV's Audience (then The 101) network in the United States. The show was an American version of CD:UK, a similarly themed music show on ITV in the UK. Its hosts were John Wynn, Becky Baeling, and Jonathan Redford. Malikha Mallette also did occasional New York City interviews.

The show was also broadcast in Southeast Asia on the Channel V music network.

Specials
On December 31, 2006, CD USA presented its first live special, a 4½ hour concert titled America's Party: Live from Fremont Street Las Vegas on CD USA. Appearing artists in that special included All American Rejects, Rock Star Supernova, OK GO, Five for Fighting, Chicago and Smash Mouth.

Artists who have performed on CD USA

10 Years - Wasteland, Paralyzing Kings
Thirty Seconds to Mars - The Story
Aly & AJ - Rush
Army of Anyone - It Doesn't Seem to Matter
Ashlee Simpson - L. O. V. E.
The 88 - Hide Another Mistake
Bow Wow - Fresh Azimiz
Brooke Hogan (with Paul Wall)
Buckcherry - Crazy Bitch, Everything, Next 2 You
Busta Rhymes - Touch It
Butch Walker & The Let's Go Out Tonites - Bethamphedamine
Cartel - Honestly
Cary Brothers - Ride
Cherish - Do It to It
Cheyenne Kimball - Hanging On
Chicago
Chingy - Pullin' Me Back
Chris Brown - Run It!
Christina Milian – Say I
Clear Static - Out of Control
Cute Is What We Aim For - Curse of Curves
Damone - Out Here All Night
Dan Band - Rock You Hard This Christmas
Daniel Powter - Bad Day
Danity Kane - Show Stopper
Dem Franchise Boyz - I Think They Like Me
E-40 - U And Dat (with T-Pain)
Eighteen Visions - Victim
Evans Blue - Cold (But I'm Still Here), Over
Fall Out Boy - Sugar, We're Goin Down
Family Force 5 - Love Addict, Kountry Gentleman
Five for Fighting
Flipsyde - Someday
Flyleaf - Fully Alive
Fort Minor - Where'd You Go, Remember the Name
Frankie J - Priceless, That Girl
The Game - One Blood
Godsmack - Speak, Shine Down
Goo Goo Dolls
Gym Class Heroes - Cupid's Chokehold, The Queen and I
Hawthorne Heights - Pens and Needles, Saying Sorry
Head Automatica- Graduation Day
Hellogoodbye - Here (In Your Arms)
Hinder - Lips of an Angel
Holly Brook - Giving it Up for You
Hoobastank - Inside of You, The First of Me*
Ill Niño- This is War
Jack's Mannequin- The Mixed Tape
Jagged Edge - Stunnas
James Blunt - You're Beautiful (from UK studios)
Jamie Kennedy and Stu Stone - Circle Circle Dot Dot, 1964
Jesse McCartney - Right Where You Want Me
Jeannie Ortega - Crowded
JoJo - Too Little Too Late, This Time
Jonas Brothers - Mandy, 6 Minutes
Kelly Clarkson - Walk Away
Kevin Federline - Lose Control
Korn - Coming Undone
KT Tunstall - Black Horse and the Cherry Tree, Suddenly I See
LeToya Luckett - Torn, She Don't
Lifehouse - Blind
Mariah Carey feat. Jermaine Dupri - Get Your Number
Matisyahu - King Without A Crown
Mario Vazquez - Gallery
McFly - I've Got You, 5 Colours in Her Hair, Obviously
MercyMe - So Long Self
Mis-Teeq - Scandalous
Missy Higgins - Scar
Morningwood - The Nth Degree
Natasha Bedingfield - Unwritten, I Bruise Easily
Ne-Yo - Sexy Love
Nelly Furtado - Promiscuous (with Timbaland)
Maneater
New Found Glory - It's Not Your Fault
OK Go - Here It Goes Again, Oh! Lately, It's So Quiet
The Panic Channel - Teahouse of the Spirits
Papa Roach - ...To Be Loved, Reckless
P.O.D. - Goodbye for Now
Powerman 5000 - Wild World
The Pussycat Dolls - Stickwitu, Buttons, Wait a Minute
Quietdrive - Rise from the Ashes
The Red Jumpsuit Apparatus - Face Down
Ray-J - One Wish
Remy Ma - Conceited
RBD - Tu amor, My Philosophy, Celestial, I Wanna Be the Rain, Ser O Parecer, Wanna Play, Save Me
Rihanna - SOS, Unfaithful
Robin Thicke - 2 the Sky, I Need Love, Wanna Love U Girl (with Pharrell)
Rob Zombie - Thunder Kiss ’65
Saving Jane - Girl Next Door
Scott Stapp
Seether - Remedy (Acoustic Version)
She Wants Revenge - Tear You Apart
Shawnna - Gettin' Some
Sierra Swan - Copper Red
Smash Mouth
Sparta - Taking Back Control
Starsailor - In the Crossfire, Keep us Together
STEFY - Chelsea
The Subways - Rock & Roll Queen
The Click Five
Switchfoot - We Are One Tonight, Oh! Gravity, Dirty Second Hands
Three 6 Mafia - Side 2 Side
T-Pain - I'm in Love with a Stripper
Too Short - Blow the Whistle
Trace Adkins - Honkey Tonk Badonkadonk
Under the Influence of Giants - Mama's Room
Van Hunt - Character
The Veronicas - When It All Falls Apart, 4ever
Veruca Salt - So Weird
Wicked Wisdom - Bleed All Over Me
Yellowcard - Lights and Sounds, Rough Landing, Holly, Ocean Avenue, Down on my Head
Ying Yang Twins
Young Jeezy - I Luv It

References

External links
 
 'DirecTV signs deal for 'CD:USA'; Digital Spy February 11, 2005
 'CD:USA ROCKS! John Wynn and Becky Baeling host'; (promo video for 'CD:USA') on YouTube January 21, 2007

2006 American television series debuts
2006 American television series endings
2000s American music television series
American television series based on British television series
Audience (TV network) original programming
Pop music television series